Sir Andrew Foster (born 29 December 1944) is a British public servant who was knighted in 2001 for his services to the health and government services.

Career and appointments
Sir Andrew's appointments have included Executive of the Audit Commission for England and Wales from 1992 and 2003, deputy chief executive (NHS), director of social services (North Yorkshire County Council), deputy chairman (Royal Bank of Canada) and advisor to the Chancellor of the Exchequer on public service. 

In 2005, he presented a comprehensive report on the English further education system, entitled "Realising the Potential".

He was appointed chair of Manx Care in April 2021.

See also
 List of Old Abingdonians

References

British civil servants
Living people
1944 births
People educated at Abingdon School
Knights Bachelor